Touqan Palace is one of the most important historical buildings in the city of Nablus and its number is more than one hundred rooms located to the western side of the Al-Beik Mosque and was built by the head of Nablus scholars Ibrahim Bey bin Saleh Pasha Touqan with funding from his father and that was in the eighteenth century AD, associated with historical and literary figures that gave him fame Significant, in particular for his association with the poet and writer Ibrahim Toukan and his poet sister Fadwa Toukan and the legal personality Qadri Toukan.

See also
Abd al-Hadi Palace
Jacir Palace

References

Buildings and structures in Nablus
Touqan Palace
Historical geology
Palaces in the State of Palestine